2,5-Dimethylhexane is a branched alkane used in the aviation industry in low revolutions per minute helicopters.  As an isomer of octane, the boiling point is very close to that of octane, but can in pure form be slightly lower. 2,5-Dimethylhexane is moderately toxic.

References

Alkanes